Humble is a commercial production company with offices in New York and Los Angeles. Humble and its sister post-production company Postal, specialize in the integration of live action production, design, edit, animation, and visual effects for advertising and original creative content.

History 
Humble, launched in 2006 by entrepreneur Eric Berkowitz is a New York-based full service, creative-driven production house, known for film direction, special effects, animation, motion graphics, 3D modeling and visual effects for television commercials, video content for the web & mobile devices, and music videos. Humble's work for Domino's Pizza was awarded a Clio and nominated for an Emmy. The Humble-produced music video for "Uprising" by Muse won the 2010 MTV Video Music Award for "Best Special Effects". Other artists' music videos produced by Humble include Wolfmother and Passion Pit.

In 2010 Humble expanded their production offering to include digital production services beyond video content.

Other notable clients have included IKEA, Samsung, Panasonic, Activision, Axe, Revlon, Starburst, Hoodie Allen, Tribeca Film Festival and The Museum of Sex.

Awards & notable achievements 
2008
 Clios – Content and Contact – Silver (Domino's "Anything Goes")
 Clios – Interactive – Bronze (Domino's "Anything Goes")
 Effies – Fast Food / Casual Dining / Restaurant – Bronze  (Domino's "Anything Goes")
 Emmy – Nomination (Domino's "Anything Goes")
2009
 MTV VMA – Breakthrough Video – Nominated (Passion Pit "The Reeling")
2010
 MTV VMA – Best Special Effects (Muse "Uprising")
2011
 Midas Award – Corporate image – Grand Midas (UBS "Stephen Wiltshire")
 Latin Grammy – Best Short Form Video – Nominee (Maná "Lluvia Al Corazón")
2012
 AICP Next Awards – Viral / Web Film (UBS "Stephen Wiltshire")
 Greenpeace "Clean Cloud" (UBS "Stephen Wiltshire")
 Omma Award – Best Integrated Online Campaign (UBS "Stephen Wiltshire")
 The Woodlands "Generations" (UBS "Stephen Wiltshire")
 TELLY Awards – Local TV Real Estate - Silver (UBS "Stephen Wiltshire")
2013
 Animation Block Party – Best Computer Animation (Tumbleweed Tango)
 Vimeo Staff Pick (Tumbleweed Tango)
 Licensed by Disney (Tumbleweed Tango)
 Featured – NY Shorts Fest, LA Shorts Fest, Hong Kong Arts Centre, Interfilm Short Film Festival (Tumbleweed Tango)
 Webby Awards – Integrated Campaign – Honoree (Mizuno "Mezamashii Run Project")
 AICP – Best Original Music (Mizuno "Mezamashii Run Project")
 Effies – Leisure Products & Services, David vs. Goliath, Small Budgets - Products, Media Idea, Influencers (Mizuno "Mezamashii Run Project")
 Creative Media Award – Communications Channel Plan (Mizuno "Mezamashii Run Project")
 ADDY – Houston – Gold and Silver (Verizon "Orchestra")
 ADDY – Houston - Best in Show for Broadcast (Verizon "Orchestra")
 U.S. Hispanic Idea Awards – Film Publications and Media (Time Warner Cable "Penny Plan")
2014
 Featured – Nantucket Film Festival, TIFF, Monstra Film Festival Portugal, Prix Ars Electronica, Holland Animation Film Festival (Tumbleweed Tango)
 The One Show – One Screen – Best Writing (The Trial of Barnaby Finch)
 Featured – NY Shorts Fest, LA Shorts Fest, Hawaii Shorts Fest, TIFF Shorts Fest (The Trial of Barnaby Finch)
2015
 Cannes Lions – Film – Personal Screens – Shortlist (Lowe's Vine " Yeti")
 ADDY – District – Internet Commercial – Silver (Nissan "Ride of Your Life")
 SXSW – Documentary Spotlight – World Premier (ESPN Films – Son of the Congo)
2016
 Webby Awards – Online Film & Video – Sports - Nominated (ESPN Films – Son of the Congo)
 AICP – Next Awards – Cause Marketing – Shortlist (A Force For Good)
 Cannes Lions – Promo & Activation – Use of Social Platform - Silver (Lowe's "In A Snap")
 Cannes Lions – Direct – Use of Mobile – Bronze (Lowe's "In A Snap")
 Cannes Lions – Entertainment – Mobile/Device Brand Experience – Bronze (Lowe's "In A Snap")
 Cannes Lions – Mobile – Content for User Engagement – Shortlist (Lowe's "In A Snap")
 Cannes Lions – Film – Other Use of Film Content – Shortlist (Lowe's "In A Snap")

References

External links 
 
 Passion Pit Breakthrough Video nominee, as reported by MTV
 Passion Pit video with full credits

Visual effects companies
Design companies of the United States
Companies based in New York City
American animation studios
Mass media companies established in 2006
Design companies established in 2006